The East Siberian Mountains or East Siberian Highlands are one of the largest mountain systems of the Russian Federation. They are located between the Central Yakutian Lowland and the Bering Strait in the Far Eastern Federal District and Northeast Siberia. The whole area of the East Siberian System has a very low population density. The territory of the mountain system is one of the Great Russian Regions.

In some areas of the East Siberian Mountains, such as the Kisilyakh Range and the Oymyakon Plateau there are kigilyakhs, the rock formations that are highly valued in the culture of the Yakuts.

Geography
The East Siberian System consists of several separate sections of mountain ranges rising to the north and south of the Arctic Circle. To the southwest the boundary is not clearly delimited, as it overlaps with the system of the South Siberian Mountains. Owing to the mountainous terrain, large swathes of the East Siberian system are uninhabited. The largest city is Magadan.

Ranges

Verkhoyansk Range 
Kharaulakh Range
Kular Range
Sietinden Range
Orulgan Range
Dzhardzhan Range
Muosuchan Range
Munni Range
Kelter Range
Ust-Vilyuy Range
Sette-Daban
Skalisty Range
Ulakhan-Bom
Kyllakh Range
Suntar-Khayata Range
Yana-Oymyakon Highlands
Elgi Plateau
Oymyakon Plateau
Yana Plateau
Nelgesin Range
Tirekhtyakh Range
Kyundyulyun
Chersky Range
Khadaranya Range
Ymiysky Range
Kisilyakh Range
Selennyakh Range
Moma Range
Ulakhan-Chistay Range
Arga-Tas
Silyap Range
Chibagalakh Range
Tas-Kystabyt
Upper Kolyma Highlands
Angachak Range
Kyun-Tas
Polousny Range
Kondakov Plateau
Suor Uyata
Ulakhan-Sis Range
Alazeya Plateau
Yukaghir Highlands
Nera Plateau
Kolyma Mountains
Omsukchan Range
Oloy Range
Ush-Urekchen
Kedon Range
Kongin Range
Maymandzhin Range
Anadyr Highlands
Anadyr Plateau
Anyuy Range
Ilirney Range
Kyrganay Range
Chuvanay Range
Shchuchy Range
Chukotka Mountains
Chantal Range
Pekulney Range
Shelag Range
Dzhugdzhur Mountains
Koryak Mountains
Ichigem Range
Olyutor Range
Ukelayat Range
Komeutyuyam Range
Rarytkin Range
Ukvushvuynen Range

Hydrography
The main rivers of the vast region are the Yana, Indigirka, Kolyma and its tributary Omolon, as well as the Anadyr.

Climate, flora and fauna
The world's lowest temperatures for inhabited places have been recorded in this region.

The lower elevations of the ranges, as well as the valleys, are largely covered by taiga.

Ecoregions

Chukchi Peninsula tundra
Cherskii-Kolyma mountain tundra
Northeast Siberian taiga

See also

Moma Natural Park

References